Medagama National School is a mixed National school located in Bibila, Monaragala District, Sri Lanka. The school was founded by Don John da Lahe in 1898 and was previously known as Medagama Maha Vidyalaya. It began as a missionary school with students from the village.

See also
Medagama
Medagama Divisional Secretariat

References 

Education in Uva Province
Schools in Monaragala District